Tumbes is a district in the middle Tumbes Province in Peru. It is bordered by Corrales District on the west, Pacific Ocean on the north,  Zarumilla Province on the east, and San Juan de la Virgen District on the south.

External links
  Municipalidad Provincial de Tumbes
  Tumbes Tour
 Manglares (mangrovie) di Tumbes (foto 2009 orellana)

pl:Tumbes